The Federales de Chiriquí are a baseball team in the Panamanian Professional Baseball League, based in Chiriquí Province, founded in 2019.

2021 Caribbean Series 
Federales de Chiriquí represented Panama at the 2021 Caribbean Series, as runners-up of the 2019–20 Panamanian Professional Baseball League.
In 2023, the team won a national championship for the first time and will therefore represent Panama at the Caribbean Series for the second time in its history.

1. The 2020–21 Panamanian Professional Baseball League season was canceled due to the ongoing COVID-19 pandemic. Panama still opted to participate in the Caribbean Series and selected the Federales franchise to represent them in the competition. The team had a mix of players from all four clubs in the league.

References 

Baseball in Panama